Gavin Nigel Xavier Harding MBE (born 18 March 1974) is a British politician and academic who was mayor of Selby, North Yorkshire, England. He was the first person in the United Kingdom to become mayor while being formally diagnosed as having a learning disability.

Harding grew up in Selby, and studied at Brayton High School and Selby College. He is a Labour councillor on Selby Town Council having lived in Selby most of his life representing Selby North ward. Harding has now been elected for his 3rd term as a councillor. He has founded a self-advocacy group Voices for People. 

Harding served as deputy mayor of Selby in 2014  before being appointed mayor the following year. In 2014, he was awarded an MBE. He has been part of a committee looking into the progress of Winterbourne View, a private hospital condemned for its abuse of people with learning difficulties since day one after panorama was shown was  one of original campaign team that made nhs England and other partners take on transforming care  .
He now works for NHS England as part of team for Improving Health & Quality team as part of the Learning Disability Programme learning Disability & Autism Award winner 2018 in the work and education category. Harding has also created and had published Beyond The High Fence' a resource for people on Ministry of Justice to be able to leave hospital and get back into the community. Is still involved in transforming care programme. he has now life story in book made possible edited by Saba Salman and was in most influence  disabled people Shaw trust power 100 2020 Named as seventh person.      

In 2019 Harding was included in the Shaw Trust "Power 100" list of the most influential disabled people for that year.
Has now step down as councillor  February has moved out of Selby to live in West Yorkshire area in 2022 after 10 years and 10 months which is record for person with learning disability in political history as a councillor

References

1974 births
People_from_Selby
Living people
Mayors of places in Yorkshire and the Humber